Feedly is a news aggregator application for various web browsers and mobile devices running iOS and Android. It is also available as a cloud-based service. It compiles news feeds from a variety of online sources for the user to customize and share with others. Feedly was first released by DevHD in 2008.

History
DevHD’s first project, Streets, which aggregates updates from a variety of online sources is the basis of Feedly. Originally called Feeddo, Feedly was first released as a web extension before moving onto mobile platforms.

On March 15, 2013, Feedly announced 500,000 new users in 48 hours due to the closure announcement of Google Reader. By April 2, 2013, the total number of new users was up to 3 million. At the end of May 2013, the total user number was up to 12 million.

Mobile app
The Feedly mobile application is available for iOS and Android devices. All versions of the app run on Streets (DevHD's other project), which allows for the application to run on the same code for all devices. Running the same code across multiple platforms lets the developers release updates faster because they are only working with one version. Like its web counterpart, the mobile application employs a minimalistic interface that imitates a magazine spread. However, unlike the browser extension, the Feedly app cannot load an entire article. Instead, it will present a summary, and a link to the actual article. The mobile application acts as a browser on its own, so any redirects happen inside the app itself, as opposed to opening a separate Internet browser. Additionally, the application adapts to the user, and will recommend posts based on what the user has read or shared in the past. The Feedly app does not support offline mode but third party apps offer the service.

Reception
Feedly has received mostly positive reviews. Many have praised its minimalist design and personalized interface. However, some have found the service relies too heavily on its minimalist approach, while others have stated that the degree of customization can be overwhelming for first-time users. Following the termination date for Google Reader, transitioning users began to express frustration at the number of seemingly basic features that were broken or missing from the latest version of Feedly. Moreover, on 8 November 2013 Feedly disabled login via OAuth, forcing users to use Google+ authentication. This change was announced less than 24 hours before taking place. Many users were unable to export their feeds, and this change was rolled back on the same day. So far the users can choose either Google+ or OAuth login.

As of 2018 Feedly had 14 million users, making it the most popular RSS reader.

Denial of service attacks
On June 11–13, 2014, Feedly suffered crippling denial-of-service attacks that prevented users from accessing their information. The attackers demanded ransom from Feedly, which Feedly refused to pay.

See also
Comparison of feed aggregators

References

External links

News aggregators
IOS software
Android (operating system) software
Web software